The West Canary skink (Chalcides viridanus), also known commonly as the Canaryan cylindrical skink, East Canary Islands skink,  the Tenerife skink, is a species of lizard in the family Scincidae. The species is endemic to the Canary Islands.

Habitat
The natural habitats of C. viridanus are temperate forest, temperate shrubland, subtropical or tropical dry shrubland, Mediterranean-type shrubby vegetation, temperate grassland, rocky areas, rocky shores, sandy shores, arable land, pastureland, rural gardens, and urban areas.

Description

Behavior
C. viridanus is active during the day and at dusk. Both its life in nature and its requirements in a terrarium are very similar to those of the Gran Canaria skink.

Reproduction
C. viridanus is viviparous.

Geographic range
C. viridianus is found on the following Canary Islands: Tenerife, El Hierro, Roque de Garachico, and Roque de Agna.

Sources
(listed chronologically)
Brown RP, Thorpe RS, Báez M (1991). "Parallel within-island microevolution of lizards on neighbouring islands". Nature 352: 60–62.
Brown RP, Thorpe RS, Báez M (1993). "Patterns and causes of morphological population differentiation in the Tenerife skink, Chalcides viridanus ". Biological Journal of the Linnean Society 50 (4): 313–328.
Brown RP, Pestano J (1998). "Phylogeography of Canary Island skinks inferred from mtDNA sequences". Molecular Ecology 7: 1183–1191.
Brown RP, Campos-Delgado R, Pestano J (2000). "Mitochondrial DNA evolution and population history of the Tenerife skink Chalcides viridanus ". Molecular Ecology 9: 1061–1069.

References

Further reading
Boulenger GA (1887). Catalogue of the Lizards in the British Museum (Natural History). Second Edition. Volume III. ... Scincidæ .... London: Trustees of the British Museum (Natural History). (Taylor and Francis, printers). xii + 575 pp. + Plates I-XL. (Chalcides viridanus, new combination, p. 402).
Gravenhorst JLC (1851). "Über die im Zoologischen Museum der Universität Breslau befindlichen Wirtelschleichen (Pseudosaura), Krüppelfüssler (Brachypoda) und einige andere, denselben verwandte Reptilien aus dem Zünften der Schleichen und Dickzüngler ". Nova Acta Academiae Caesarae Leopoldina Carolinae Germaninicae Naturae 23 (1): 291–394. (Gongylus viridanus, new species, pp. 348–350 + Plate XXXV, figures 1–6). (in German).

External links
Photo 

Reptiles of the Canary Islands
Chalcides
Reptiles described in 1851
Taxa named by Johann Ludwig Christian Gravenhorst
Taxonomy articles created by Polbot